JPA may refer to:
Jacksonville Port Authority
Jakarta Persistence API, a Java programming language API
Japanese Poolplayers Association
Joint Personnel Administration
Joint Powers Authority
Journal of Psychoeducational Assessment
Juice Products Association
Juvenile Protective Association
Public Service Department (Malaysia) (in )